FEM (the first letters of the word "feminine" or "female" and roughly homophonous with femme, but also the Norwegian word for "five") is a Norwegian television channel targeting young women. It broadcasts from London and is the second channel of TVNorge, part of Warner Bros. Discovery EMEA.

FEM was created for the launch of the digital terrestrial television platform RiksTV and started broadcasting on September 3, 2007.

The channel will show series such as Dirt and Big Love as well as original programming.

Programming 
List of programs broadcast by FEM

References

External links

FEM at LyngSat Address

Warner Bros. Discovery networks
Television channels and stations established in 2007
Television channels in Norway
Warner Bros. Discovery EMEA